Anthony Tudor St John, 22nd Baron St John of Bletso (born 16 May 1957) is a British peer, politician, businessman and solicitor. He is one of the ninety hereditary peers elected to remain in the House of Lords after the House of Lords Act 1999.  He speaks on African affairs (and is a notable expert on Southern Africa), deregulation, financial services and information technology.  Rather than aligning with a particular political party, he remains a crossbencher.

Life and career
Born to Andrew St John, 21st Baron St John of Bletso, he succeeded to his father's titles in 1978. He was educated at the University of Cape Town, where he graduated with a Bachelor of Arts and Bachelor of Science, and at the University of South Africa, where he graduated with a Bachelor of Laws. He was further educated at the London School of Economics and received a Master of Laws. Lord St John took his seat in the House of Lords in 1979.

Between 1985 and 2002, he worked as an oil analyst at County NatWest Securities and then Smith New Court Plc and thereafter served as a consultant to Merrill Lynch until 2008. He built up the Internet Datacentre business of Globix Corporation in the UK and then became President of Global Sales and Marketing for the International Group. Between 2004 and 2012, he was Non-Executive Chairman of Spiritel Plc, a telecommunications service provider and served as a Non-Executive Director at Sharp Interpak, WMRC and Pecaso. He has also been on the Advisory Board of Infinity SDC and Chayton Capital with the focus on agriculture and business opportunities in Africa. His company, African Business Solutions, assists International companies seeking to invest in Africa specifically in infrastructure, broadband, financial services and renewable energy. He currently serves as Chairman and Non-Executive Director of several listed and un-listed companies.

Since 1998 Lord St John has served as an extra Lord-in-Waiting to HM The Queen. He has recently served on the House of Lords Communications Select Committee and the Ad hoc select committee on artificial intelligence. He is currently Vice Chairman of the All Party Parliamentary Africa Group, Zimbabwe group and South Africa group as well as the endangered species group.  He served as Chairman of the charity, Citizens Online from 2001 to 2008. He is currently a trustee of Christel House Europe and trustee emeritus of Alexandra Rose Charities, Tusk Trust and Television Trust for the environment.

His special interests are foreign affairs, particularly Africa, clean technology, wildlife conservation and sport. He plays a proactive role in the charitable sector, as a trustee of 7 charities mostly focused on poverty reduction, education and wildlife conservation in Southern Africa.

Personal
Anthony St John married Dr Helen Jane Westlake, they have 4 children. Lord St John is now married to Sabina St John and they have 5 children between them.

Notes

References

External links
 The Saint John family, bedfordshire.gov.uk

1957 births
Living people
University of Cape Town alumni
Alumni of the London School of Economics
Anthony
Crossbench hereditary peers
Barons St John of Bletso
Hereditary peers elected under the House of Lords Act 1999